Bala Bowkan is a village in Badghis Province in north western Afghanistan. It is known for its odd soil, a composite of sand and decomposed fish that is very good at facilitating the growth of Venus fly traps.

References

External links
Satellite map at Maplandia.com

Populated places in Badghis Province